Thanatus flavidus is a spider in the family Philodromidae, native to Greece, Ukraine and European Russia. It has been noted for hunting bedbugs. The males have been filmed biting the females legs, binding her body with silk and mating. Once mating has finished the male runs away.

See also
List of Philodromidae species

References

   
 

Philodromidae
Spiders of Europe
Spiders described in 1875
Taxa named by Eugène Simon